Dame Parveen June Kumar,  (born 1 June 1942) is a British doctor who is currently Professor of Medicine and Education at Barts and The London School of Medicine and Dentistry. She worked in the NHS for over 40 years as a consultant gastroenterologist and physician at Barts and the London Hospitals and the Homerton University Hospital. She was the President of the British Medical Association in 2006, of the Royal Society of Medicine from 2010-2012, of the Medical Women's Federation from 2016-2018 and of the Royal Medical Benevolent Fund from 2013-2020. She was also Vice President of the Royal College of Physicians from 2003-2005. In addition, she was a founding non-executive director of the National Institute of Clinical Excellence, chaired the Medicines Commission UK until 2005, and also chaired the BUPA Foundation Charity for Research until 2013.

Kumar co-founded and co-edited Kumar and Clark's Clinical Medicine, which is now in its 10th edition, a standard medical textbook which is used around the world. She has also held several leadership roles in medical education. She set up the first MSc course in Gastroenterology in the UK, and continues to teach, lecture and examine medical students and doctors across the globe. Apart from medical education, she is also very interested in global health and set up the Global Health Initiative at the Royal Society of Medicine when she was President.

Kumar was awarded DBE in 2017, CBE in 2000, the BMA Gold Medal in 2007, and was the first Asian Professional Woman of the year in 1999. She also has several other honours and honorary degrees.

Early life and education
Born in Lahore (then British India), Kumar was initially educated in the famous Lawrence School Sanawar in India. Kumar moved to the United Kingdom and studied medicine at St Bartholomew's Hospital Medical College, then training as a gastroenterologist under Sir Anthony Dawson and Michael Clark.

Career
After qualifying, Kumar worked at St. Bartholomew's, Homerton University Hospital and the Royal London Hospital as a gastroenterologist. Specialising in small bowel diseases, such as coeliac disease, she was an elected member of the British Society of Gastroenterology's Council, and started the first gastroenterology MSc course in the UK. Interested in education, Kumar became academic sub-dean at Barts, then accepting the job of Director of Post-Graduate Medical Education. She co-founded and co-edited the textbook Clinical Medicine with Clark. Clinical Medicine is now a standard work, and is used worldwide: the 9th edition was released in 2017.

In 1999, Kumar was appointed a non-executive director of the National Institute of Clinical Excellence, resigning in 2002 following her appointment as Chairman of the Medicines Commission UK. In 2006 she became President of the British Medical Association, and in 2010 was appointed President of the Royal Society of Medicine. She served as Vice-President of the Royal College of Physicians, and also held the positions of the Director of CPD, and International education. She was a trustee of The Medical College of St Bartholomew's Hospital Trust and also of CancerBackup.

Kumar is also a trustee of the British Youth Opera and healthcare funder Barts Charity, and the BMA Foundation for Medical Research.

Awards and honours
In 1999, she became the first recipient of the Asian Woman of the Year (Professional) award, and in 2000 was appointed Commander of the Order of the British Empire (CBE) in recognition of her services to medicine. She was also a recipient of the British Medical Association's Gold Medal for "services to Medicine and Education".

She was appointed Dame Commander of the Order of the British Empire (DBE) in the 2017 Birthday Honours for services to medicine and medical education.

In 2017, she was awarded a Lifetime Achievement for contributions to Medicine by the British Association of Physicians of Indian Origin (BAPIO) and in 2019 she won the BMJ Award for Outstanding Contribution to Health.

References

1942 births
British women medical doctors
21st-century British medical doctors
Living people
Presidents of the British Medical Association
Presidents of the Royal Society of Medicine
Presidents of the Medical Women's Federation
Dames Commander of the Order of the British Empire
Indian emigrants to the United Kingdom
Naturalised citizens of the United Kingdom
Alumni of the Medical College of St Bartholomew's Hospital